is a railway station in the city of Yaita, Tochigi, Japan, operated by the East Japan Railway Company (JR East).

Lines

Station layout
This station has an elevated station building with one island platform and one side platform underneath; however, platform 2 is not in use. The station is staffed.

Platforms

History
Kataoka Station opened on 5 June 1897. With the privatization of JNR on 1 April 1987, the station came under the control of JR East.

Passenger statistics
In fiscal 2019, the station was used by an average of 730 passengers daily (boarding passengers only).

Surrounding area
Kataoka Post Office

See also
 List of railway stations in Japan

References

External links

 JR East station information 

Railway stations in Tochigi Prefecture
Tōhoku Main Line
Utsunomiya Line
Railway stations in Japan opened in 1897
Yaita, Tochigi
Stations of East Japan Railway Company